Mali competed at the 2020 Summer Olympics in Tokyo. Originally scheduled to take place from 24 July to 9 August 2020, the Games were postponed to 23 July to 8 August 2021, because of the COVID-19 pandemic. Since the nation made its debut in 1964, Malian athletes have appeared in every edition of the Summer Olympic Games, with the exception of the 1976 Summer Olympics in Montreal because of the African boycott.

Competitors
The following is the list of number of competitors in the Games.

Athletics

Mali received universality slots from the World Athletics to send two track and field athletes (one male and one female) to the Olympics.

Track & road events

Swimming

Mali received a universality invitation from FINA to send a top-ranked male swimmer in his respective individual events to the Olympics, based on the FINA Points System of June 28, 2021.

Taekwondo

Mali entered one athlete into the taekwondo competition at the Games. Seydou Fofana secured a spot in the men's lightweight category (68 kg) with a top two finish at the 2020 African Qualification Tournament in Rabat, Morocco.

References

Nations at the 2020 Summer Olympics
2020
2021 in Malian sport